A Bend in the Ganges (1964) is a novel by the Indian author Manohar Malgonkar. The novel opens with the civil disobedience movement of the early 1930s and ends with the partition riots in Punjab. It encompasses the Swadeshi movement, the activities of the freedom fighters, the outbreak of the Second World War, the British retreat from Rangoon, the Bombay dock explosion and the division of India in 1947. The epigraph of this novel is from the Ramayana: "At a bend in the Ganges, they paused to take a look at the land they were leaving".

This story revolves around three male protagonists: Gian Talwar- who is very much influenced by the Gandhian ideology of non-violence; Debi Dayal and Shafi Usman are other two who often uses "Jai-Ram: Jai Rahim" slogan to equate their feeling toward secularism. The fundamental difference between Talwar and Debi-Shafi duo lies in their ideology. As Talwar picks 'Gandhian nonviolence' as his way to fight against the British atrocities, Debi-Shafi finds violence as the only option left. Freedom fighters also establish 'The Hanuman Club', an institution for their physical and spiritual upliftment in a country which is immensely divided due to its variations in political ideology and religious fragility.

References

1964 novels
1964 Indian novels